Mąkoszyce may refer to the following places:
Mąkoszyce, Greater Poland Voivodeship (west-central Poland)
Mąkoszyce, Lubusz Voivodeship (west Poland)
Mąkoszyce, Opole Voivodeship (south-west Poland)